Rob DePaola was the drummer for various punk rock bands in Chicago, including The Broadways and The Honor System.

References

American punk rock drummers
American male drummers
American drummers
Musicians from Chicago
The Broadways members
The Honor System (band) members
Living people
Year of birth missing (living people)